Pavel Korejčík (born 10 December 1959) is a retired Czech football player who played in the Czechoslovak First League for Škoda Plzeň and Dukla Prague. He won the league title with Dukla in the 1981–82 season, and amassed 251 league appearances and 88 goals during his career.

References

External links
 Síň slávy Dukla Praha 1948 - 2009 Pavel Korejčík 

1959 births
Living people
People from Beroun District
Czech footballers
Czechoslovak footballers
Czechoslovakia under-21 international footballers
Association football forwards
FC Viktoria Plzeň players
Dukla Prague footballers
Czechoslovak expatriate footballers
Czechoslovak expatriate sportspeople in Malaysia
Czech expatriate sportspeople in Malaysia
Expatriate footballers in Malaysia
Sportspeople from the Central Bohemian Region
FK Dukla Prague managers